The 19669/19670 Udaipur City - Patliputra Humsafar Express is a superfast express train of the Indian Railways connecting  in Rajasthan and  in Bihar. It is currently being operated with 19669/19670 train numbers on a weekly basis.

Coach Composition 

The train is completely 3-tier AC sleeper designed by Indian Railways with features of LED screen display to show information about stations, train speed etc. and will have announcement system as well, Vending machines for tea, coffee and milk, Bio toilets in compartments as well as CCTV cameras.

Service

It averages 48 km/hr as 19669/Udaipur City - Patliputra Humsafar Express starts on Wednesday from  covering 1565 km in 32 hrs 55 mins & 49 km/hr as 19670/Patliputra - Udaipur City Humsafar Express starts on Saturday from  covering 1565 km in 32 hrs 10 min. The route between DDU and Kanpur via Lucknow should have been avoided. More than 100 km more has to be covered. Similarly, the distance between Kanpur and Bharatpur could have been reduced by another 100 km.
This might have been done keeping in view of Varanasi, Lucknow and Kasganj passengers. But, Patliputra passengers may view this as a useless bargain. They feel that for long-distance trains, the average speed must be around 61 kmph instead of 48 kmph.

Traction

Both trains are hauled by a WDP 4D of Bhagat Ki Kothi Diesel Locomotive Shed on its entire journey.

Route & Halts

Direction Reversal

Train Reverses its direction 2 times:

See also

 Udaipur City - Delhi Sarai Rohilla Rajasthan Humsafar Express
 Udaipur City - Mysuru Palace Queen Humsafar Express

References

External links 

 19669/Udaipur City - Patliputra Humsafar Express
 19316/Indore - Lingampalli Humsafar Express

Humsafar Express trains
Transport in Udaipur
Transport in Patna
Rail transport in Rajasthan
Rail transport in Uttar Pradesh
Rail transport in Bihar
Railway services introduced in 2018